Donald Thomas (born 1 July 1984) is a Bahamian high jumper from Freeport, Bahamas.

Biography
Thomas initially played basketball at Bishop Michael Eldon School in Freeport, Bahamas, before taking up high jump in January 2006 while studying at Lindenwood University in Saint Charles, Missouri, where he played on the University's basketball team. He tried high jump for the first time when challenged by members of the track and field team, who were reacting to his claims about his ability to slam dunk. Thomas cleared 6'6" (1.98 m) on his first attempt and 7' (2.13 m) on his third-ever jump. The athletes then sought the head track coach Lane Lohr, who entered Thomas in a meet two days later at Eastern Illinois University. At the meet, he cleared 7'3.25" (2.22 m) on his seventh-ever jump.

In March 2006, Thomas placed second at the 2006 NAIA Indoor Track & Field National Championships with a height of 7'1.75" (2.18 m). Later that month, just two months after taking up high jump, he finished fourth at the 2006 Commonwealth Games in Melbourne with a jump of 2.23 m. Not yet experienced at high jump, Thomas gained notoriety at the Commonwealth Games for not measuring his run-up, competing in shoes without spikes, and putting his arms behind his back to land on the mat as if breaking his fall.

During the 2007 indoor season, he cleared 2.30 metres for the first time and in March jumped 2.33 metres in Fayetteville, Arkansas. In July 2007 he cleared 2.35 metres in Salamanca, Spain. The result was a new personal best and the world season's best at the time. He then won the 2007 World Championships in Osaka, Japan, again with a 2.35 jump. He also won gold at the 2007 IAAF World Athletics Final. That year, he also won the IAAF Newcomer of the Year and the Bahamas Amateur Athletic Association Athlete of the Year.

The Olympics in 2008, however, turned out to be a major disappointment for Thomas. He made only 2.20 in the qualifying round and finished 21st overall.

Thomas won the gold medal in the high jump at the 2010 Commonwealth Games in Delhi, India. In the final, he was the only competitor to clear the height of 2.32, which he managed on the first attempt. His countryman Trevor Barry won the silver medal in the event. In 2011, he won the gold medal in the high jump at the Pan American Games in Guadalajara, Mexico, again with a height of 2.32.

Thomas competed in the 2012 Summer Olympics in London, United Kingdom. In qualification, he cleared 2.16, passed on 2.21, failed to clear 2.26, and did not advance to the final.

Thomas represented the Bahamas at the 2016 Summer Olympics in Rio de Janeiro, Brazil. He made the final for the first time at an Olympic competition and finished in equal 7th place with a jump of 2.29.

He competed at the 2020 Summer Olympics.

Competition record

References

External links

 Auburn Tigers bio
 2006 Commonwealth Games profile

1984 births
Living people
People from West Grand Bahama
Bahamian male high jumpers
Bahamian men's basketball players
Auburn Tigers men's track and field athletes
Auburn University alumni
Athletes (track and field) at the 2006 Commonwealth Games
Athletes (track and field) at the 2010 Commonwealth Games
Athletes (track and field) at the 2014 Commonwealth Games
Athletes (track and field) at the 2018 Commonwealth Games
Olympic athletes of the Bahamas
Athletes (track and field) at the 2008 Summer Olympics
Athletes (track and field) at the 2012 Summer Olympics
Athletes (track and field) at the 2016 Summer Olympics
Athletes (track and field) at the 2020 Summer Olympics
Athletes (track and field) at the 2007 Pan American Games
Athletes (track and field) at the 2011 Pan American Games
Athletes (track and field) at the 2015 Pan American Games
Athletes (track and field) at the 2019 Pan American Games
Commonwealth Games gold medallists for the Bahamas
Pan American Games gold medalists for the Bahamas
Pan American Games silver medalists for the Bahamas
Pan American Games bronze medalists for the Bahamas
World Athletics Championships medalists
Lindenwood Lions men's basketball players
World Athletics Championships athletes for the Bahamas
People from Freeport, Bahamas
Commonwealth Games medallists in athletics
Pan American Games medalists in athletics (track and field)
Central American and Caribbean Games gold medalists for the Bahamas
Competitors at the 2010 Central American and Caribbean Games
Competitors at the 2018 Central American and Caribbean Games
IAAF Continental Cup winners
World Athletics Championships winners
Central American and Caribbean Games medalists in athletics
Medalists at the 2007 Pan American Games
Medalists at the 2011 Pan American Games
Medalists at the 2015 Pan American Games
Athletes (track and field) at the 2022 Commonwealth Games
Medallists at the 2010 Commonwealth Games